The 2012–13 season was Budapest Honvéd FC's 102nd competitive season, 8th consecutive season in the OTP Bank Liga and 103rd year in existence as a football club.

First team squad

Transfers

Summer

In:

Out:

Winter

In:

Out:

List of Hungarian football transfers summer 2012
List of Hungarian football transfers winter 2012–13

Statistics

Appearances and goals
Last updated on 2 June 2013.

|-
|colspan="14"|Youth players:
|-

|-
|colspan="14"|Players out to loan:
|-

|-
|colspan="14"|Players no longer at the club:
|-

|}

Top scorers
Includes all competitive matches. The list is sorted by shirt number when total goals are equal.

Last updated on 2 June 2013

Disciplinary record
Includes all competitive matches. Players with 1 card or more included only.

Last updated on 2 June 2013

Overall
{|class="wikitable"
|-
|Games played || 47 (30 OTP Bank Liga, 4 UEFA Europa League, 5 Hungarian Cup and 8 Hungarian League Cup)
|-
|Games won || 23 (15 OTP Bank Liga, 2 UEFA Europa League, 3 Hungarian Cup and 3 Hungarian League Cup)
|-
|Games drawn || 10 (7 OTP Bank Liga, 0 UEFA Europa League, 0 Hungarian Cup and 3 Hungarian League Cup)
|-
|Games lost || 14 (8 OTP Bank Liga, 2 UEFA Europa League, 2 Hungarian Cup and 2 Hungarian League Cup)
|-
|Goals scored || 81
|-
|Goals conceded || 61
|-
|Goal difference || +20
|-
|Yellow cards || 113
|-
|Red cards || 12
|-
||Worst discipline ||  Drissa Diarra (7 , 3 )
|-
|rowspan="2"|Best result || 4–0 (H) v Gyirmót SE – Hungarian League Cup – 13 November 2012
|-
| 4–0 (H) v Diósgyőri VTK – Hungarian Cup – 21 November 2012
|-
|rowspan="2"|Worst result || 0–4 (H) v FC Anzhi Makhachkala – UEFA Europa League – 26 July 2012
|-
| 0–4 (H) v Videoton FC – OTP Bank Liga – 3 March 2013
|-
||Most appearances ||  Patrik Hidi (41 appearances)
|-
||Top scorer ||  Richárd Vernes (14 goals)
|-
|Points || 79/141 (56.03%)
|-

Nemzeti Bajnokság I

Matches

Classification

Results summary

Results by round

Hungarian Cup

League Cup

Group stage

Classification

knockout phase

Europa League

The First and Second Qualifying Round draws took place at UEFA headquarters in Nyon, Switzerland on 25 June 2012.

References

External links
 Eufo
 Official Website
 UEFA
 fixtures and results

Budapest Honvéd FC seasons
Budapest Honved